Buky is an urban-type settlement in Uman Raion of Cherkasy Oblast (province) of Ukraine. It hosts the administration of Buky settlement hromada, one of the hromadas of Ukraine. Population: 

Until 18 July 2020, Buky belonged to Mankivka Raion. The raion was abolished in July 2020 as part of the administrative reform of Ukraine, which reduced the number of raions of Cherkasy Oblast to four. The area of Mankivka Raion was merged into Uman Raion.

References

Notes

Sources
 

Urban-type settlements in Uman Raion
Umansky Uyezd